The 2006 Patriot League men's basketball tournament was played at Hart Center in Worcester, Massachusetts and Sojka Pavilion in Lewisburg, Pennsylvania after the conclusion of the 2005–06 regular season. Top seed Bucknell defeated second seed , 74–59 in the championship game, to win its second Patriot League Tournament title. The Bison earned an automatic bid to the 2006 NCAA tournament as #9 seed in the Oakland region. In the round of 64, Bucknell defeated #8 seed Arkansas 59–55.

Format
All eight league members participated in the tournament, with teams seeded according to regular season conference record.

Bracket

References

Tournament
Patriot League men's basketball tournament
Patriot League men's basketball tournament
Patriot League men's basketball tournament
Patriot League men's basketball tournament